Karugampattur 632013 is a census town in Vellore district in the Indian state of Tamil Nadu.

Demographics
 India census, Karugampattur had a population of 5272. Males constitute 50% of the population and females 50%. Karugampattur has an average literacy rate of 59%, lower than the national average of 59.5%: male literacy is 69%, and female literacy is 49%. In Karugampattur, 14% of the population is under 6 years of age.

References

Cities and towns in Vellore district